Eight "host communities" are selected each year by the Register's Annual Great Bicycle Ride Across Iowa organizers, except that there were only seven in 1973, the first year.  Two of the communities are the beginning and end points, while the other six serve as overnight stops for the bicyclists. From 1973 to 2016, the distance between consecutive host communities averaged about 67 miles (ǂ). The average length of the overall RAGBRAI course has been 467 miles (ǂ).  1985 was the longest at 540 miles (ǂ) and 1977 the shortest at 400 miles (ǂ).

ǂ Note:  Excluding the "century loop".

At the beginning of the ride, riders traditionally dip the rear wheel of their bikes in either the Missouri River or the Big Sioux River (depending on the starting point of the ride). At the end of the ride, the riders dip the front wheels in the Mississippi River.  There was at least one incident of a rider losing his bike after riding into the Mississippi River.

Some facts about RAGBRAI:
 As of 2022, 14 communities have served as the starting point, and 12 have hosted the finish.
 108 communities have been overnight hosts.
 The ride passed through all 99 of Iowa's counties in its history.
 Atlantic served as overnight host 7 times (1974, 1980, 1989, 1991, 2001, 2011, 2019)
 Sioux City served as the starting point 8 times (1973, 1978, 1988, 1993, 2001, 2010, 2015, 2023).
 Two cities served as the starting point 7 times each: Council Bluffs (1974, 1986, 1994, 2000, 2009, 2013, 2019) and Glenwood (1980, 1984, 1989, 1992, 2003, 2011, 2016).
 In 2019, Burlington became the first community to be both a finish as well as an overnight host that was not a finish. In the previous 5 times (1979, 1984, 1990, 2000, and 2009) Burlington was the finish point, but in 2019 it was an overnight host town (on a Friday).
 1978 was the first year with recurring host cities (Sioux City and Storm Lake).  
 1981 was the last year with all "first-time" host cities.  
 1999 was the first year with no "first-time" host city (all were repeats from prior years), with 2001–2003, 2007, 2010, 2012–2013, 2015–2016, 2018-2019, and 2023 having similar distinction.  
 2022 was the most recent year with a new "first-time" host city (Pocahontas).
 Iowa City has the distinction of the "city with longest time between hosting" at 42 years (1976 and 2018), with Lansing as the next-longest at 40 years (1977 and 2017), and Centerville and Leon tied for the third-longest at 35 years (both hosted in 1981 and 2016).  
 Williamsburg has the distinction of being the "city with longest time without a repeat" (1973 to present) and Camp Dodge is a close second (1974 to present).

By year
Click on column headings to sort.

By city
Click on column headings to sort.

References

Bicycle tours
Sports in Iowa
Cycling in Iowa
Cycling-related lists